Dzięciołowo can refer to:
 Dzięciołowo, Podlaskie Voivodeship
 Dzięciołowo, West Pomeranian Voivodeship